Ellomenos is a former municipality on the island of Lefkada, Ionian Islands, Greece. Since the 2011 local government reform it is part of the municipality Lefkada, of which it is a municipal unit. It is located in the southeastern part of the island, and has a land area of 56.017 km². Its population was 3,570 at the 2011 census. The seat of the municipality was in the town of Nydri (pop. 971). Its next largest towns are Vlychó (440), Perigiáli (315), and Kallithéa (428).

Subdivisions
The municipal unit Ellomenos is subdivided into the following communities (constituent villages in brackets):
Charadiatika (Charadiatika, Alatro, Steno)
Fterno
Katochori (Katochori, Desimi)
Neochori (Neochori, Kallithea, Agios Christoforos, islet Madouri)
Nydri (Nydri, Rachi)
Platystoma (Platystoma, Perigiali)
Poros (Poros, Mikros Gialos)
Vafkeri
Vlycho (Vlycho, Geni)

Population

References

External links
Official website 
Ellomenos on GTP Travel Pages (in English and Greek)

See also

List of settlements in the Lefkada regional unit

Populated places in Lefkada (regional unit)